National Geographic Panda is a pet simulation game developed by Bandai Namco Entertainment and licensed by National Geographic.

The game focuses on the player raising their own panda with an educational spin on it.  The player gets a set allowance each day to buy water, food and toys for their panda.

References 

Nintendo DS games